Lake La Rose is a community in the Canadian province of Nova Scotia, located in Annapolis County. It is at an elevation of approximately 135m, adjacent to a lake of the same name.

References

Communities in Annapolis County, Nova Scotia